The Empire State is a Big Finish Productions audio drama featuring Lisa Bowerman as Bernice Summerfield, a character from the spin-off media based on the long-running British science fiction television series Doctor Who.

Cast
Bernice Summerfield — Lisa Bowerman
Maggie — Sophie Louise Dann
Rand — Simon Watts
Saf — Philip Edgerley
Jason Kane — Stephen Fewell

External links
Big Finish Productions - Professor Bernice Summerfield: The Empire State 

Bernice Summerfield audio plays
Fiction set in the 27th century